Jocelyn is a township in the Canadian province of Ontario, located on St. Joseph Island in the Algoma District. The current reeve of the township is Mark Henderson. Jocelyn is home to Fort St. Joseph National Historic Site.

The primary community in the township is Kentvale, which is located around Kentvale Merchants Limited, the largest general store on St. Joseph Island. Kentvale Merchants Limited is actually located in the Township of St. Joseph and previously operated under the name Kentvale General Merchants. It was opened in 1888 by Emily M. Kent and Frederick B. Kent. A community outdoor hockey rink on the property provided recreation for this farming community for many years. It was operated by the Kent family and volunteers from the community.

The original operation consisted of a grist and saw mill operated by Frederick and a store that Emily ran. At the time of this writing in 2005, the fourth generation of the original owners are operating the store. Today the store sells groceries, hardware, dry goods, building supplies, lawn and garden equipment, gasoline, fishing gear, feed for livestock and much more.

Demographics 

See also
List of townships in Ontario

References

External links

Municipalities in Algoma District
Single-tier municipalities in Ontario
St. Joseph Island (Ontario)
Township municipalities in Ontario